Mikhail Ivanovich Budyko (20 January 1920 – 10 December 2001) was a Soviet and Russian climatologist and one of the founders of physical climatology. He pioneered studies on global climate and calculated temperature of Earth considering simple physical model of equilibrium in which the incoming solar radiation absorbed by the Earth's system is balanced by the energy re-radiated to space as thermal energy.

Budyko's groundbreaking book, Heat Balance of the Earth's Surface, published in 1956, transformed climatology from a qualitative into a quantitative physical science. These new physical methods based on heat balance were quickly adopted by climatologists around the world. In 1963, Budyko directed the compilation of an atlas illustrating the components of the Earth's heat balance.

Life
Ethnically Belarusian, Budyko earned his M.Sc. in 1942 from the Division of Physics of the Leningrad Polytechnic Institute. As a researcher at the Leningrad Geophysical Observatory, he received his doctorate in physical and mathematical sciences in 1951. Budyko served as deputy director of the Geophysical Observatory until 1954, as director until 1972, and as head of the Division for Physical Climatology at the observatory from 1972 until 1975. In that year he was appointed director of the Division for Climate Change Research at the State Hydrological Institute in Leningrad.

Studies
He was the first researcher to discuss the Pleistocene megafauna extinction. Budyko published a study in 1969 outlining Arctic amplification, describing how Arctic sea ice decline affects Arctic temperatures due to the ice–albedo feedback. The study attracted significant attention since it hinted at the possibility for a runaway positive feedback within the global climate system.

In 1972, Budyko published forecasts focusing on Arctic sea ice and global mean temperature extending out 100 years. He calculated that a few tenths of one percent increase in solar radiation input could melt the icecaps. Budyko reckoned that, as early as 2050, the Arctic Ocean's ice cover could be melted away entirely. His models showed that a 50% increase in atmospheric CO2 would melt all the polar ice, whereas a reduction of the gas by half "could lead to a complete glaciation of the Earth."

In 1972, Budyko calculated that a mere few tenths of one percent increase in solar radiation input could melt the ice caps. Moreover, his models similarly indicated that a 50% increase in atmospheric CO2 would melt all the polar ice, whereas reduction of the gas by half "can lead to a complete glaciation of the Earth." Due to the rising use of fossil fuels, at some time "comparatively soon (probably not later than a hundred years)... a substantial rise in air temperature will take place." As early as 2050, Budyko calculated, the Arctic Ocean's ice cover could be melted away entirely.

In 1987 Budyko together with Yuri Izrael published a study on anthropogenic climate change dealing with climate impact assessment, concluding that parts of the northern hemisphere would gain some benefit from climate change. However, near the end of his life in 1998 he gave a speech titled, "Global Climate Warming and its Consequence" when accepting the Blue Planet Prize 1998, and concluding, "On balance, it is very difficult to conclude with higher accuracy whether the projected global warming would be globally beneficial to human society or not."

In 1990, Budyko was co-author of section five of the IPCC First Assessment Report, writing about equilibrium climate change and its implications for the future, and was a peer reviewer for the report.

Climate engineering
Budyko is believed to have been the first, in 1974, to put forth the concept of artificial solar radiation management with stratospheric sulfate aerosols if global warming ever became a pressing issue. This climate engineering proposal has been dubbed "Budyko's Blanket" in his honor.

Bibliography
Испарение в естественных условиях, Л., 1948; 
Атлас теплового баланса, Л., 1955 (ред.); 
Тепловой баланс земной поверхности, Л., 1956.
Andronova, Natalia G. Budyko, Mikhail Ivanovich. In Encyclopedia of Global Environmental Change, edited by Ted Munn, vol. 1. New York: Wiley, 2002.
Dr. Mikhail I. Budyko. Profiles of the 1998 Blue Planet Prize Recipients. The Asahi Glass Foundation. 2001 [cited May 23, 2002]. .
Budyko, M. I., G. S. Golitsyn, and Y. A. Izrael. Global Climatic Catastrophes. New York: Springer-Verlag, 1988.
Budyko, M. I., Global Ecology. Progress Publisher Moscow, 1980
Budyko, M. I. and Y. A. Izrael., eds. Anthropogenic Climatic Change. Tucson: University of Arizona Press, 1991.
Budyko, M. I., A. B. Ronov, and A. L. Yanshin. History of the Earth's Atmosphere. New York: Springer-Verlag, 1987.
Budyko, Mikhail I. "Global Climate Warming and its Consequence." Blue Planet Prize 1998 Commemorative Lectures . Ecology Symphony. October 30, 1998 [cited May 23, 2002].

Notes

References

External links
Mikhail I. Budyko's Ice-Albedo Feedback Model
Mikhail Budyko's (1920–2001) contributions to Global Climate Science: from heat balances to climate change and global ecology
Oral history interview transcript with Mikhail Budyko on 25 March 1990, American Institute of Physics, Niels Bohr Library & Archives - interview conducted by Spencer Weart

1920 births
2001 deaths
Corresponding Members of the USSR Academy of Sciences
Full Members of the Russian Academy of Sciences
Peter the Great St. Petersburg Polytechnic University alumni
Lenin Prize winners
Recipients of the Order "For Merit to the Fatherland", 4th class
Recipients of the Order of the Red Banner of Labour
Russian people of Belarusian descent
Russian climatologists
Burials at Serafimovskoe Cemetery
Soviet meteorologists